The 2007 Copenhagen Masters in badminton was the 15th edition of the Copenhagen Masters. It was held in Copenhagen, from December 27 to December 29, 2007.

Only three categories were played: men's singles, women's singles and men's doubles.

Men's singles

Group 1

Group 2

Finals

Women's singles

Group 1

Group 2

Finals

 retired because of a knee injury

Men's doubles

Group 1

Group 2

Finals

References

External links
Tournamentsoftware: Draws & results

Copenhagen Masters
Copenhagen Masters
Copenhagen Masters